The Gateway Collegiate Athletic Conference was a women's-only college athletic conference which operated in the midwestern United States from its inception in 1982 to its absorption by the Missouri Valley Conference in 1992.

History
The Gateway Collegiate Athletic Conference was founded in August 1982 as a women's-only conference. The charter members consisted of Bradley University, Drake University, Eastern Illinois University, Illinois State University, Indiana State University, the University of Northern Iowa, Southern Illinois University, Southwest Missouri State University, Western Illinois University and Wichita State University.

In 1985, the Gateway added football (its only men's-sponsoring sport) with Eastern Illinois, Illinois State, Northern Iowa, Southern Illinois, Southwest Missouri State and Western Illinois as the charter members. Indiana State joined the league for that sport in the following year. For football, Eastern Illinois, Western Illinois, Northern Iowa and Southwest Missouri State previously competed in the Mid-Continent Conference, while Illinois State and Southern Illinois previously competed in the then-NCAA Division I-A Missouri Valley Conference, and Indiana State previously competed as an NCAA Division I-AA independent.

In 1992, the Gateway Collegiate Athletic Conference was merged into the Missouri Valley Conference. The league's football side was spun off into the standalone Gateway Football Conference, known since 2008 as the Missouri Valley Football Conference. The MVFC and MVC, although separate leagues, now share five members and operate out of the same offices in St. Louis.

Members

Charter/final members

Membership timeline

See also
 Missouri Valley Conference
 Missouri Valley Football Conference
 Summit League

References

Defunct NCAA Division I conferences
1982 establishments in the United States
1992 disestablishments in the United States
Sports leagues established in 1982
Sports leagues disestablished in 1992